was a village located in Taki District, Mie Prefecture, Japan.

As of 2003, the village had an estimated population of 5,182 and a density of 96.72 persons per km². The total area was 53.58 km².

On January 1, 2006, Seiwa was merged into the expanded town of Taki and thus no longer exists as an independent municipality.

External links
Official website of Taki 

Dissolved municipalities of Mie Prefecture